Dərvişli (also, Dovrushlu and Dervishli) is a village and municipality in the Bilasuvar Rayon of Azerbaijan.  It has a population of 1,374.

References 

Populated places in Bilasuvar District